Swag is a crime novel by Elmore Leonard, first published in 1976 and since also released as an audio recording. The first paperback edition was published under the alternative title of Ryan's Rules.

Ernest Stickley, Jr. reappears in Stick.

Plot summary
Frank Ryan is an almost honest used car salesman, who after deliberately not testifying against car thief Ernest "Stick" Stickley, Jr., thinks of a foolproof plan for them to perform armed robberies.
The plan is about simple everyday armed robbery.  Supermarkets, bars, liquor stores, gas stations, etc. Because the statistics prove that this armed robbery pays the most for the least amount of risk, they start their business and earn three to five thousand dollars a week.
To prevent getting caught Frank introduces 10 golden rules for successful armed robbery:

 Always be polite on the job and say please and thank you.
 Never say more than necessary. Less is more.
 Never call your partner by name-unless you use a made-up name.
 Never look suspicious or like a bum and dress well.
 Never use your own car.
 Never count the take in the car.
 Never flash money in a bar or with women.
 Never go back to an old bar or hangout once you have moved up.
 Never tell anyone your business and never tell a junkie even your name.
 Never associate with people known to be in crime.

For a while, Frank and Stick are able to follow the rules and the plan and they are extremely successful.  They even rob the robber who just robbed the bar they were in. But, inevitably, the rules start falling by the wayside and when they see a chance for a big score, the rules go out the window, with predictably disastrous results.

Notes

External links
Swag at Elmore Leonard.com

Novels by Elmore Leonard
1976 American novels
Novels set in Detroit